2 A.M. may refer to:

A time on the 12-hour clock

Music
2AM (band), a South Korean band
2AM, a 1993 album by saxophonist Theo Travis
"2AM" (Adrian Marcel song), a 2014 song by Adrian Marcel
"2AM" (Bear Hands song), a 2016 by Bear Hands on the album You'll Pay For This
"2 A.M." (Iron Maiden song), a song on the album X Factor
"2 A.M." (Slightly Stoopid song), a song on the album Chronchitis
"2AM", a 2007 song by Hiem and Philip Oakey
 "2AM", a song by SZA from the 2022 deluxe edition of Ctrl (2017)
2:00 AM (album), by Raquel Sofía (2018)

See also
"Breathe (2 AM)", a 2004 song by Anna Nalick
2:00 AM Paradise Cafe, 1984 album by Barry Manilow
 2AM (company) an American film production company

Date and time disambiguation pages